The Chuanjie Formation,  is a geological formation in Yunnan, China. It dates back to the Middle Jurassic. It was formerly referred to as being the lower member of the "Upper Lufeng" as opposed to the underlying "Lower Lufeng" now referred to as the Lufeng Formation. Tracks of theropods and sauropods, as well as thyreophorans are known from the formation.

Fossil content

See also
 List of dinosaur-bearing rock formations

References

Bibliography 

 
   
   
  

Geologic formations of China
Jurassic System of Asia
Jurassic China
Bajocian Stage
Mudstone formations
Siltstone formations
Lacustrine deposits
Ichnofossiliferous formations
Paleontology in Yunnan